The Gospel of Bartholomew is a missing text amongst the New Testament apocrypha, mentioned in several early sources. It may be identical to either the Questions of Bartholomew, the Resurrection of Jesus Christ (by Bartholomew), or neither.

Early source references to the Gospel of Bartholomew
In the prologue to his commentary on Matthew, Jerome mentions a "Gospel of Bartholomew" among several other apocryphal gospels.

The author of the Decretum Gelasianum includes "the Gospels in the name of Bartholomew" in a list of condemned or unacceptable scriptures.

See also
List of Gospels
Questions of Bartholomew

References

Bartholomew
New Testament apocrypha

pl:Ewangelia Bartłomieja
pt:Evangelho de Bartolomeu
sl:Evangelij po Jerneju
sh:Evanđelje po Bartolomeju
sr:Јеванђеље по Вартоломеју